T Lalnunpuia (born 19 March 1993, in Mizoram) is an Indian professional footballer who plays as a striker for Aizawl in the I-League.

Career

Rangdajied United
Lalnunpuia made his professional debut for Rangdajied in the I-League on 29 September 2013 against Bengaluru at the Bangalore Football Stadium; in which he played till the 57th minute before he was being replaced by Laldingngheta; as Rangdajied lost the match 3–0.

Career statistics

References

External links 
 Goal Profile

1993 births
Living people
Indian footballers
Footballers from Mizoram
Rangdajied United F.C. players
I-League players
Association football forwards
Aizawl FC players